The American Journal of Respiratory and Critical Care Medicine is a biweekly peer-reviewed medical journal published by the American Thoracic Society. It covers the pathophysiology and treatment of diseases that affect the respiratory system, as well as topics of fundamental importance to the practice of pulmonary, critical care, and sleep medicine. It was established in March 1917 as the American Review of Tuberculosis. Since then there have been several title changes. In 1953 a subtitle was added, "A Journal of Pulmonary Diseases." In 1955 the title became the American Review of Tuberculosis and Pulmonary Diseases, and in 1959 the American Review of Respiratory Diseases (the final "s" was dropped in 1966). The journal obtained its current title in 1994.

The journal was established by the National Tuberculosis Association, which became the American Lung Association, and which published the journal from 1917 until 1994 when its medical section, the American Thoracic Society, became the publisher.

Editors
The following persons are or have been editor-in-chief of the journal:

Abstracting and indexing
The journal is abstracted and indexed in:

According to the Journal Citation Reports, the journal has a 2021 impact factor of 30.528, ranking it 2nd out of 36 journals in the category "Critical Care Medicine" and 2nd out of 64 journals in the category "Respiratory System".

References

Further reading

External links
 

Publications established in 1917
Pulmonology journals
English-language journals
Biweekly journals
Academic journals published by learned and professional societies of the United States